The sacrum is curved upon itself and placed very obliquely, its base projecting forward and forming the prominent sacrovertebral angle when articulated with the last lumbar vertebra.

It is also known as the "lumbosacral angle".

See also
 Sacral promontory
 Pelvic inlet

References

Bones of the thorax